Arcobaleno means rainbow in Italian. Specifically it may refer to:

Arcobaleno Records, a record label based in the UK and founded in 2005 by Serge Santiágo
, a 1943 Italian film
Arcobaleno selvaggio, a 1984 Italian film 
Arcobaleno Valle d'Aosta, a coalition of political parties active in Italy's Aosta Valley
Arcobaleno (Reborn), a group of characters of the Reborn! anime and manga series
Arcobaleno (tariff), a public transport fare tariff used in the Swiss canton of Ticino
Linea arcobaleno, a railway line that forms part of the Naples Metro